Lyse Lemieux may refer to:
 Lyse Lemieux (judge)
 Lyse Lemieux (artist)